Hurricane Marco was the first of two tropical cyclones to threaten the Gulf Coast of the United States within a three-day period, with the other being Hurricane Laura. The thirteenth named storm and third hurricane of the record-breaking 2020 Atlantic hurricane season, Marco developed from a fast-moving tropical wave west of the Windward Islands and south of Jamaica on August 20. The fast motion of the wave inhibited intensification initially, but as the wave slowed down and entered a more favorable environment, the system developed into a tropical depression, which in turn rapidly intensified into a strong tropical storm. Due to strong wind shear, Marco's intensification temporarily halted; however, after entering the warm waters of the Gulf of Mexico on August 23, Marco briefly intensified into a hurricane, only to quickly weaken later that evening due to another rapid increase in wind shear. Marco subsequently weakened to a tropical depression before degenerating into a remnant low early the next morning. Marco's remnants subsequently dissipated on August 26.

Heavy rains across the Yucatán Peninsula caused river rises and flooding throughout the region. One person was indirectly killed in Tapachula, Mexico, due to the storm, although this was not included in the official death toll. Impacts in the United States were generally minor, as the storm was quite weak when it impacted the Gulf Coast.

Meteorological history

At 00:00 UTC on August 16, the National Hurricane Center (NHC) began monitoring a westward-moving tropical wave over the Central Atlantic that had the potential for development. The system slowed down and gradually organized south of the Greater Antilles on August 19. By 15:00 UTC on August 20, satellite imagery revealed that the wave had developed a well-defined low-level center, prompting the NHC to designate it Tropical Depression Fourteen. Post-storm analysis found that the system formed nine hours earlier at 06:00 UTC. The storm continued westward toward Honduras, before making a sharp turn northward. Despite favorable conditions, the storm initially failed to intensify, with pulsing convection around a poorly defined center. Eventually, the storm's center became better defined and a small but persistent cluster of convection formed over it. This allowed the depression to intensify, and the NHC upgraded the system to Tropical Storm Marco in the northwest Caribbean at 03:00 UTC on August 22. This was the earliest 13th named storm ever recorded in the Atlantic basin, breaking the record set by Hurricane Maria of 2005 by 11 days.

Shortly after being named, Marco continued to contradict the forecasts and followed a more northerly course. Contrary to prior predictions, Marco's track was shifted eastward at the 21:00 EDT advisory on August 22, as the system moved north-northeastward instead of north-northwestward, introducing the possibility of successive landfalls around Louisiana from both Laura and Marco. An increase of southwesterly wind shear brought an abrupt end to the strengthening trend, as Marco moved through the Yucatán Channel, with the storm's minimum central pressure rising slightly and the eyewall mostly dissipating as the storm took on a sheared appearance. This weakening period proved to be short-lived, as the shear relaxed somewhat when Marco moved into the warm waters of the Gulf of Mexico on August 23. Slow but steady strengthening resumed and data from another Hurricane Hunter reconnaissance aircraft discovered sustained winds at hurricane strength in the northeastern eyewall. Subsequently, an update from the NHC confirmed that Marco had intensified into a Category 1 hurricane at 16:30 UTC on August 23.

This strengthening proved to be short-lived, however, as upper-level wind shear increased again over the storm. This caused Marco to weaken back to a tropical storm by 03:00 UTC on August 24, and the center of circulation became displaced from the storm's convection. Relentless wind shear continued to plague the system as it turned westward near the Louisiana coastline, and Marco rapidly weakened to minimal tropical storm strength by 18:00 UTC. Operationally, the NHC said that the storm made landfall here, but that was changed in post-storm analysis. Afterward, Marco weakened further and fell to tropical depression intensity just offshore of Louisiana, near Grand Isle, at 03:00 UTC on August 25, before degenerating into a remnant low three hours later. The remnant low continued to spin down as it slowly moved westward along the Louisiana coastline, ahead of the approaching Hurricane Laura, before opening up into a trough at 00:00 UTC on the next day.

Preparations

Honduras issued tropical storm watches along its coastline when Tropical Depression Fourteen was designated, before quickly upgrading to warnings hours later. Tropical Storm Watches, and later Tropical Storm Warnings and Hurricane Watches, were also issued for the eastern side of the Yucatán Peninsula, as the storm was first predicted to move over the peninsula as a strong tropical storm. When Marco moved to the north instead of northwest, a Tropical Storm Warning was issued by the Government of Cuba for the Pinar del Río Province and the Isle of Youth.

Tropical Storm, Hurricane, and Storm Surge Watches were issued in Louisiana, Mississippi, and Alabama when Marco's forecast track shifted significantly eastward on August 22. Many of these watches were upgraded to warnings as the storm continued its approach. In the state of Texas, the Padre Island National Seashore closed on August 22 in preparation for the hurricane. In Mississippi, mandatory evacuation orders were in place on August 23 at the Gulfport and Biloxi marinas and the harbor in Long Beach. All boats were ordered to be moved by sundown that same day. In Gulfport, the fuel dock was closed. However, all the warnings were eventually downgraded and canceled when the storm rapidly weakened as it approached the coast. 600 additional resources from were requested from Alabama Power, Georgia Power, and other power crews to help restoration efforts. A tornado watch was issued for Far Southeast Alabama, the Florida Panhandle, Southwest Georgia, and the Coastal Waters at 20:40 UTC on August 24.

Impacts

Latin America and Cayman Islands
The Instituto Meteorológico Nacional of Costa Rica reported that heavy rain from the indirect effects of Marco affected parts of the country for three days. Areas in and around Santa Cruz reported flooding.

In Mexico, an indirect death occurred in Tapachula, Chiapas. Despite this, the NHC did not attribute Marco to any deaths in their post-storm report. Rainfall totals were as high as 186.4 millimeters (18.64 cm), with the states Veracruz, Oaxaca, and Chiapas worst affected by heavy rains. In some municipalities of Chiapas, such as Tapachula, Escuintla and Acacoyagua, there was flooding due to the growth of rivers that come from mountains nearby.

While traversing the Yucatán Channel, Marco brought heavy rain to parts of Pinar del Río Province in Cuba on August 23. Minor flooding occurred in Mantua and Sandino. A few trees were uprooted during the storm.

United States

Due to the sheared nature of the storm as it came ashore in the United States, rain bands extended as far northeast as Virginia. A tornado warning was issued for a storm just northeast of Panama City, Florida. Another tornado warning was issued for a storm near Charleston, South Carolina. Numerous special marine warnings were also issued due to possible waterspouts. However, no tornadoes or waterspouts were confirmed. Rainfall totals were highest along the Florida Panhandle, peaking at  near Apalachicola on Monday morning. Several roadways and a hotel were flooded in Panama City Beach that evening as well. However, heavy rainfall extended much further inland with flash flood warnings being issued as far northeast as the North Carolina—Virginia border. Due to Marco being much weaker than anticipated, no wind damage occurred and the peak wind gust from the storm was only , which was recorded in Petit Bois Island, Mississippi. The remnants of the storm brought heavy rainfall and flash flooding to Southeastern Oklahoma on August 26 before dissipating. Overall, Marco caused at least $35 million USD in damages throughout the impacted areas.

See also

 Tropical cyclones in 2020
 Other storms of the same name
 List of Category 1 Atlantic hurricanes
 Tropical Storm Arlene (2005) – a similar storm that affected similar areas
 Hurricane Cindy (2005) – a storm that had a similar track
 Hurricane Nate (2017) – also caused flooding in Central America and Cuba
 Tropical Storm Alberto (2018) – a storm that affected similar areas

References

External links

 The National Hurricane Center's Advisory Archive on Hurricane Marco
 National Hurricane Center (NHC)
 Weather Prediction Center (WPC)

Marco
Marco
Marco
2020 in the Caribbean
2020 in Mexico
2020 in the United States
Marco
Marco
Marco
Marco
Marco